TheYakovlev AIR-9 / AIR-9bis was a 2-seat sport aircraft designed and built in the USSR during the early 1930s.

Design and development
From 1933 Yakovlev and his design team developed a 2-seat low-wing monoplane sport aircraft with open  cockpits, wooden wings, welded steel tube fuselage, powered by a Shvetsov M-11 engine. Fitted with landing flaps and automatic leading-edge slats, the AIR-9 design was submitted to a safe aircraft design competition, but was not proceeded with.

The original AIR-9 design was re-worked in 1934 to include enclosed cockpits, but dispensing with the automatic slats. The tandem cockpits were fitted with sliding canopies; the forward canopy slid rearwards over the fixed centre canopy section and the rear canopy slid forwards under the centre-section.

The structure of the AIR-9 followed Yavovlev's previous designs with wooden plywood and fabric covered wings, welded steel tube fabric-covered fuselage and Duralumin fabric covered tail surfaces. The fixed spatted main undercarriage was supported by struts, later fitted with trousers as well as spats, with a fixed tail-skid or tailwheel (as exhibited at the 1935 Milan airshow).

The AIR-9 was powered by a single  Shvetsov M-11 five-cylinder air-cooled radial driving a fixed pitch 2-bladed wooden propeller, variously fitted with individual exhaust stacks, collector ring and Townend ring cowling.

AIR-9bis
In 1935 the AIR-9 was modified, or a second aircraft built, with a forward sloping windshield and re-designated AIR-9bis. The large number of variations in configuration suggest that there were more than one aircraft, but this cannot be confirmed.

Operational history
The AIR-9bis was displayed at the 1935 Paris and Milan airshows, and in 1937, was flown by I.N. Vishnevskaya and Ye.M. Mednikova to set a women's altitude record in the FAI Class C category.

Variants
AIR-9 The original open cockpit 2-seat low-wing monoplane sport aircraft design, with split flaps and automatic leading edge slats; not proceeded with.
AIR-9The original design reworked with closed cockpits and other refinements but without automatic slats. At least one built, at some stage seen with racing number 31.
AIR-9bis Further modifications prompted re-designation to AIR-9bis, introducing a forward sloping windshield and undercarriage trousers. One converted from the AIR-9 or possibly several new built aircraft, seen wearing racing number 32.

Specifications (AIR-9bis)

References

1930s Soviet sport aircraft
AIR-9
Single-engined tractor aircraft
Low-wing aircraft
Aircraft first flown in 1934